Ammon is a rural unincorporated community in the southeastern corner of Amelia County in the U.S. state of Virginia, located on SR 600 (Ammon Road) near Dinwiddie and Nottoway counties. The nearest volunteer fire department is at Mannboro, 5 miles northwest.

The name "Ammon" likely came from the Bible; the people of Ammon were perennial opponents of the ancient Israelites in the Old Testament.

At the turn of the 20th century, Ammon was listed as having its own post office. Ammon is now served by the post office in Ford, VA, ZIP code 23850, 6 miles south in Dinwiddie County.

The immediate vicinity of Ammon appears to have been spared significant action during the Civil War, although the Battle of Namozine Church was fought just 3 miles northeast, and troops from both sides would have passed close by afterwards as Confederate forces retreated and Union forces pursued.

Ammon School, built sometime between 1917 and 1920, was among the first of several Rosenwald Schools in Amelia County. It was designed for one teacher and located on modern-day SR 610 (Wills Road), likely a small structure that once stood approximately 1 mile northwest of Ammon proper. During the early 20th century, the Rosenwald School project was a collaborative effort that constructed thousands of facilities across the South primarily for the education of African American children. The Ammon School property was advertised for sale in the 1960s, after desegregation.

References

Unincorporated communities in Virginia
Unincorporated communities in Amelia County, Virginia